The Uhuru Torch (Swahili: Mwenge wa Uhuru, literally "Torch of Freedom") is one of the National Symbols of Tanzania. It is a kerosene torch. It symbolizes freedom and light. It was first lit on top of Mount Kilimanjaro on December 9, 1961 by Alexander Donald Gwebe-Nyirenda.  Symbolically to Shine the country and across the borders to bring hope where there is despair, love where there is enmity and respect where there is hatred. The Uhuru Torch race takes place every year starting from different places throughout the country.

See also
Uhuru Monument
Arusha Declaration Monument
Order of the Uhuru Torch at Orders, decorations, and medals of Tanzania

References 

National symbols of Tanzania